The Miami Life Awards is an annual awards, where several actors television movies including category are nominated to be awarded a prize.

Awards and Nominations for Novela

Categories

Best Telenovela

Best Female Main Character Telenovela

Best Male Main Character Telenovela

Best Supporting Actress telenovela

Best Supporting Actor telenovela

Best First telenovela actress

Best First telenovela actor

Best young actress telenovela

Best young actor telenovela

Best Television Channel

Social

Print Magazine of the year

Newspaper of the Year

References 

American television awards
Miami Life Awards